Downhill is a hamlet in the parish of St Eval, Cornwall, England.

References

Hamlets in Cornwall